ATA antibodies may refer to:
Anti-transglutaminase antibodies
Anti-topoisomerase antibodies
Anti-thyroglobulin antibodies